Opytne may refer to several places:

Places
Ukraine
Opytne, Bakhmut Raion, village in Bakhmut Raion, Donetsk Oblast
Opytne, Yasynuvata Raion, village in Yasynuvata Raion, Donetsk Oblast